Naane Varuven is a 1992 Tamil language film, directed by Sripriya and produced by Girija. The film script was written by Sripriya. Music was by Shankar–Ganesh. The film stars Rahman and Sripriya, with Rajani, Vagai Chandrasekhar, Vadivukkarasi, Gautami and Raadhika in supporting roles. It is a spiritual sequel to the 1979 film Neeya?. The film was remade in Kannada as Nagini (1991).

Plot

Cast 
 Rahman as Raja
 Sripriya as Naga Rani
 Rajani as Priya
 Vagai Chandrasekhar as Sathya
 Vadivukkarasi as Lakshmi
 Gautami as Thangam
 Raadhika as Dr. Radhika
 R. S. Manohar as Saint, Guest Appearance
 Chinni Jayanth as Saint Assistant
 S. S. Chandran as Saint Assistant
 Ramya Krishnan as Cameo Appearance
 Varalakshmi as Sathya's Mother
 Gokila as Gypsy

Soundtrack 
Music was composed by Shankar–Ganesh and lyrics were written by Vaali and Panju Arunachalam. The playback singers consist of S. P. Balasubrahmanyam and K. S. Chithra.

Reception 
N. Krishnaswamy of The Indian Express wrote, "Though the plot moves like that of a mythological film for some time, it leaves that track and builds on excellent technical values (camera: Prasad Babu), background score (Shanker Ganesh) and screenplay (Sripriya) to enhance the dramatic highs of the script."

References

External links 
 

1990s Tamil-language films
1992 films
1992 thriller films
Films about reincarnation
Films about shapeshifting
Films scored by Shankar–Ganesh
Films set in Chennai
Indian sequel films
Indian thriller films
Tamil films remade in other languages
Films directed by Sripriya